Godfather Buried Alive (stylised as godfather buried alive) is the second studio album by Belizean-American rapper Shyne. It was released on August 10, 2004 by Def Jam, while Shyne was in the middle of serving a 10-year jail sentence for a 1999 shooting in New York City. The album included 13 tracks, 12 of which were previously recorded vocals, while one was recorded over the phone from jail. It features guest appearances from Kurupt, Nate Dogg, Foxy Brown and Ashanti, and production from Kanye West, Swizz Beatz, Mike Dean and Just Blaze, among others. The album debuted at #3 on the Billboard 200 with 158,000 copies sold in its first week, making Shyne the second rapper after 2Pac to have an album debut in the top 10 of the Billboard 200 while incarcerated.

Background 

After the release of his debut album in September 2000, Shyne was sentenced to 10 years in prison in June 2001 and released from his contract with Bad Boy Entertainment. A bidding war ensued, with numerous labels meeting with Shyne in prison and offering him contracts. Shyne eventually signed a $3 million contract with Def Jam Records, and plans were made to release his second studio album. Due to the fact Shyne was unable to professionally record new music while in prison, the album was largely composed of music he had recorded prior to his incarceration. Certain lines, however, were recorded over a prison phone. The only song fully recorded from prison was For The Record, a diss track recorded over the phone and made in response to 50 Cent dissing Shyne on Hot 97 during a freestyle.

Chart performance

Weekly charts

Year-end charts

Track listing

References 

2004 albums
Albums produced by Swizz Beatz
Albums produced by Buckwild
Albums produced by Irv Gotti
Albums produced by Kanye West
Albums produced by Just Blaze
Def Jam Recordings albums
Shyne albums